WHL0137-LS, also known as Earendel, is a star in the constellation of Cetus. Stars like Earendel can be observed at cosmological distances thanks to the large magnification factors involved, that can exceed 1000. Other stars have been observed through this technique, such as Godzilla.

Observation 

Earendel's discovery by the Hubble Space Telescope was reported on 30 March 2022. The star was detectable due to gravitational lensing caused by the presence of the galaxy cluster WHL0137-08 between it and the Earth, concentrating the light from the star. Computer simulations of the lensing effect suggest that Earendel's brightness was magnified between one thousand and forty thousand times. The dates of Hubble's exposure to the star's light were 7 June 2016, 17 July 2016, 4 November 2019, and 27 November 2019.

The star was nicknamed Earendel by the discoverers, derived from the Old English name for 'morning star' or 'rising light'. Eärendil is also the name of a half-elven character in one of J. R. R. Tolkien's books, The Silmarillion, who travelled through the sky with a radiant jewel that appeared as bright as a star. NASA astronomer Michelle Thaller confirmed that the reference to Tolkien was intentional. The star's host galaxy, WHL0137-zD1, was nicknamed "Sunrise Arc", because gravitational lensing distorted its light into a long crescent.

Further observations by Hubble and the James Webb Space Telescope have been proposed to better define the properties of the star. James Webb's higher sensitivity is expected to allow the analysis of Earendel's stellar spectra and determine whether it is actually a single star. The spectral analysis would reveal the presence of elements heavier than hydrogen and helium, if any.

On 30 July 2022, an image of Earendel was captured by the James Webb Space Telescope during its first imaging campaign of the star.

Physical properties 
The light detected from Earendel was emitted 900 million years after the Big Bang. The star has been determined to have a  redshift, meaning the light from Earendel reached Earth 12.9 billion years later. However, due to the expansion of the universe, the star's observed position is now 28 billion light-years away. The previous most distant star, MACS J1149 Lensed Star 1, has a redshift of 1.49, and is now 14.4 billion light-years away.

As observed, Earendel is likely to have a mass of between 50 and 100 solar masses, and an effective surface temperature of at least . Stars this large usually explode as a supernova just a few million years after forming. Although unlikely, Earendel has a small probability of being a population III star, meaning it would contain almost no elements other than primordial hydrogen and helium.

See also
 List of star extremes
 List of the most distant astronomical objects
 Nature timeline

Notes

References 

20220330
Cetus (constellation)
Hubble Space Telescope
Intergalactic stars
Things named after Tolkien works